North & Western Bus Lines was an Australian bus company operating route bus services and charter coaches in Sydney.

History
The origins of North & Western Bus Lines can be traced back to the late 1920s when Richard Smith formed Hunters Hill Bus Company (HHBC) purchasing route 234 Gladesville to Woolwich wharf service from Walter Bruce. In 1941, the business was sold to John A Gilbert.

In December 1945, route 99 Crows Nest to Greenwich wharf was purchased from Ernie Holley, followed in 1948 by route 75 Gladesville to North Ryde and 205 Ryde to Northern Suburbs Cemetery from Fred Rohr and route 53 Riverview to Chatswood station from Bill Nott. Also in 1948, HHBC commenced operating route 126 Gladesville to Ryde.

In July 1955, route 95 Chatswood station to Gladesville was purchased from Longueville Motor Bus Company, followed in June 1957 by route 85 Eastwood to Midway. Also in 1957, HHBC commenced operating route 141 Ryde to Macquarie Park, followed in November 1963 by route 228 Ryde to Eastwood and in January 1967 by route 43 Chatswood station to Ryde. In September 1973, route 128 Chatswood to Mowbray Road was purchased.

In April 1978, Ken Butt, who had managed the operation for 13 years, purchased HHBC and renamed the operation North & Western Bus Lines. In August 1981, the Eastwood and Epping services of the Cumberland Group were purchased and the operation rebranded as Metro West Bus Lines. The Metro West operations were later incorporated into North & Western in June 1992.

The routes acquired were:
86: Parramatta station - Eastwood
87: Eastwood - West Ryde
150: Eastwood - Carlingford
152: Gladesville - Meadowbank
163: Epping - North Epping
172: Parramatta station - Eastwood

In June 1986, routes 54 Chatswood station to Macquarie University and 89 Ryde to Epping via Eastwood were purchased from Deanes Coaches. In August 1989, routes 261 Lane Cove - Wynyard and 264 Northwood - Chatswood station were purchased from Harbour City Coaches.

In January 1995, a new depot was opened next to the State Transit Authority's Ryde depot with the three depots at Gladesville, Meadowbank and Rydalmere consolidated.

In November 1999, terms to sell the business were agreed with Connex, having beaten the State Transit Authority and National Express/Westbus. However, after several postponements of the handover date, it was announced that the business had been purchased by the State Transit Authority in December 1999. This was driven by a political desire to introduce State Transit's cheaper fares to several marginal electorates.

Routes
The routes at the time the business was sold were:
261: Lane Cove  - Queen Victoria Building
264: West Ryde station - Queen Victoria Building via Lane Cove
531: Ryde - Macquarie Centre
532: Chatswood station - Riverview
533: West Ryde station - Macquarie Centre
534: Chatswood station - West Ryde station
536: Chatswood station - Meadowbank
538: Woolwich wharf - Gladesville
539: Gladesville - Macquarie University
541: Eastwood - Epping
542: West Ryde - Eastwood
543: Eastwood - Carlingford
544: Eastwood - Ryde
545: Parramatta station – Ryde via Eastwood
546: Parramatta station- Bettington Road Loop Oatlands
547: Epping - North Epping
550: Chatswood station - Parramatta station
551: Chatswood station - Epping

Fleet
North & Western Bus Lines operated 94 buses and two coaches at the time of its sale. Hunter Hill Bus Company was painted in a livery of red lower panels with cream upper panels. North & Western Bus Lines adopted a white with red and blue stripes livery.

References

Bus companies of New South Wales
Bus transport in Sydney
Defunct bus companies of Australia
Transport companies disestablished in 1999
1999 disestablishments in Australia